Maria Luísa Reisderfer Rodrigues (born 29 August 1993), known professionally as Malu Rodrigues, is a Brazilian actress.

Career
She began her preparation with courses at the agency TOPS, by Ieda Ribeiro, and at CAL, and with the directors Luiz Antônio Rocha, Sura Berditchevsky, Márcio Trigo and Augusto Thomas Vannucci. With singing classes since 2002, she had as preparers for singing the actresses and singers Telma Costa, Agnes Moço, Mirna Rubim and Ester Elias, besides the actor and singer Maurício Moço.

In the dance, she joined the Maria Olenewa Dance School from 2002 to 2005. Later she joined the casting of the children's modeling agency Ieda Ribeiro (Ieda Ribeiro Casting), as part of a group of young actors.

She has appeared in several critically acclaimed and award-winning musicals.

Filmography

Television

Film

Stage

References

External links

1993 births
Living people
Actresses from Rio de Janeiro (city)
Brazilian people of German descent
Brazilian telenovela actresses
Brazilian film actresses
Brazilian television actresses
Brazilian stage actresses